Bharatha Matha Higher Secondary School is a private school located in Palakkad, Kerala, India. The school was established in 1978 and it was incorporated in 1979 by the Carmelites of Mary Immaculate congregation. The campus is located in Chandranagar beside the Palakkad - Coimbatore highway, Near McDonald's.

External links
Bharathamatha Higher Secondary School in keralaschools
Official website
Bharathamatha Higher Secondary School in schoolskerala.com

Schools in Palakkad
Private schools in Kerala
1979 establishments in Kerala
High schools and secondary schools in Kerala
Educational institutions established in 1979